Peter Gemeinder (31 January 1891 in Dillhausen – 29 August 1931 in Mainz) was a Gauleiter of the Nazi Party (NSDAP) and a member of the German Reichstag.

Early years
Gemeinder attended elementary school in Biebrich until 1905. He then worked as a bricklayer until 1908 and as a factory worker to help support his family. In 1911 he enlisted as a soldier in Nassau Pioneer Battalion No. 21, headquartered in Kassel. He served in the First World War from 1914 to the end of the war in 1918, becoming an Offiziersstellvertreter (Officer Deputy) in December 1917. He was wounded in action and was awarded the Iron Cross, 2nd Class. Gemeinder was discharged from the Reichswehr in July 1920 and found employment as a business representative in Kassel.  At the end of 1921, he started working at the Finance Office in Frankfurt am Main where he would remain employed for the next ten years.

Nazi political career
On 26 May 1922, together with Jakob Sprenger, Gemeinder became one of the founding members of the Frankfurt NSDAP. By 1923, he joined Gottfried Feder’s “Fighting League (Kampfbund) for Breaking Interest Bondage” that demanded nationalization of all banks and an abolition of interest. In December 1924, in the aftermath of the Beer Hall Putsch when the Nazi Party was outlawed, Gemeinder became a member of the National Socialist Freedom Party. At this time he became a City Councillor in Frankfurt, serving until December 1930.
 
On 2 June 1925, Gemeinder formally rejoined the Nazi Party, just over three months after the ban on it was lifted. In June 1926 he became the Nazi Party faction leader in the City Council.  On 1 March 1927, Sprenger named him Ortsgruppenleiter (Local Group Leader) of greater Frankfurt. On 17 November 1929, he was elected to the Landtag of the Prussian province of Hesse-Nassau. In 1930 he also attained membership in the Communal Diet of the Regierungsbezirk Wiesbaden (Government Region of Wiesbaden). On 14 September 1930, Gemeinder entered national politics when he was elected to the Reichstag from electoral constituency 19, Hesse-Nassau.

On 9 January 1931, Gemeinder succeeded Friedrich Ringshausen becoming the second Gauleiter of Gau Hesse-Darmstadt, which comprised the People's State of Hesse. However his tenure was short, as on 29 August of the same year he died of a heart attack, after speaking at a Party rally in Mainz. He was denied burial in a Catholic cemetery, a move that sparked protests from the Party. He was succeeded as Gauleiter by Karl Lenz.

External websites

 Peter Gemeinder in Hessian Biography

References

Sources

1891 births
1931 deaths
Gauleiters
Members of the Reichstag of the Weimar Republic
National Socialist Freedom Movement politicians
Nazi Party officials
Nazi Party politicians
People from Hesse-Nassau
Politicians from Frankfurt
Recipients of the Iron Cross (1914), 2nd class
Reichswehr personnel